Martin S. (Marty) Zied (Born November 30, 1951) is a six-time Emmy Award winning documentary television and film producer, director, and writer. His Emmys include The Kerner Commission Report - 20 Years Later, The Homeless, and Love and Anger. Zied also co-produced the 20/20 episode that featured a one-on-one interview with Osama Bin Laden, 48 Hours Mystery Virginia Tech Anatomy of a Rampage, and MSNBC Investigates A Different Drum, where he led the first-ever camera crew into the Burning Man Festival.

Career

Current
Zied's current projects include a biography about Philadelphia baseball star, Dick Allen, and the feature-length film, Voice Messages. He is the Senior Producer for the Paul F.Harron studios at Drexel University in Philadelphia. His class in television production won a regional Emmy Award (2012) and has won 3 Telly Awards (2010, 2011, 2012).

Awards 
 1984-85 Emmy for Outstanding Feature News/”The Homeless.” 
 1986 PWIC Sarah Award TV Feature 
 1987 PWIC Sarah Award TV Feature 
 1987-88 Emmy for Outstanding Feature News/”The Kerner Commission Report-20 yearslater.” 
 1988-89 Emmy for Outstanding TV Series/”Women Behind Bars.” 
 1989-90 Emmy for Outstanding Feature News/Series/”Love and Anger.” 
 1990-91 Emmy for Outstanding Service News/”How to Avoid Raising a Brat.” National Academy of Television Arts & Sciences 
 (NATAS) award for Best College Production Newscast
 2011 PennState Abington/Alumni Achievement Award

References
Martin S. (Marty) Zied IMDb link.

American documentary film directors
1951 births
Living people